The Painted Bride Art Center, sometimes referred to informally as The Bride, is a non-profit artist-centered performance space and gallery particularly oriented to presenting the work of local Philadelphia artists, which presents dance, jazz, world, folk and electronic music, visual arts, theatre and performance art, poetry and spoken word performances. It is located at 5212 Market Street in the West Philadelphia neighborhood of Philadelphia, Pennsylvania,

The Painted Bride was founded as a gallery space in an old bridal shop on South Street in 1969 by Gerry Givnish, Sylvia and Larry Konigsberg, Frank Vavricka, A. John Kammer, and Deryl Mackie. Its name derives from a mannequin placed in the shop's window, which became an attraction as people came by to see what provocative outfit it was wearing, or what lewd position it was placed in.  In 1973, the gallery gave rise to the Painted Bride Quarterly, a poetry and literary journal. In 1977, having received funding from the Comprehensive Employment and Training Act (CETA), the Bride hired its first paid staff. The six employees worked in all aspects of management. In 1982 it moved to its current location.

The Bride, which is part of the National Performance Network includes a 225-seat performance space – the Gerry Givnish Theatre – and has several galleries in which to mount visual arts shows.  The New York Times referred to the center as a "wonderful, welcoming and often edgy" venue which "set the trend of cultural activity in Old City" when it was founded.

The center receives funding from numerous sources. In 1984, it was the only Philadelphia arts institution to be awarded a $100,000 challenge grant by the National Endowment for the Arts, but by 1996, with Federal grants to the arts diminishing, it received only $10,000, which was $20,000 less than had been budgeted for that performance year. The center also receives funding from the City of Philadelphia  and the Pew Charitable Trust.

The outside of the former industrial building The Bride is located in is completely covered by Skin of the Bride, a mosaic by Philadelphia artist Isaiah Zagar, which he created between 1991 and 2000 and donated to the center.

In 2020, the Painted Bride organization sold the building to developer Atrium Design Group. 
They had to go to court in order to sell the building. They refused a $2.65 million offer by the Lantern Theater Company, which would have kept the building as an arts venue.

See also
Painted Bride Quarterly
Isaiah Zagar
Old City, Philadelphia

References
Notes

External links

Official website
Finding aid for the Painted Bride Art Center records at the University of Pennsylvania Libraries

Arts centers in Pennsylvania
Theatres in Philadelphia
Art museums and galleries in Philadelphia
Mosaics
Art galleries established in 1969
1969 establishments in the United States
Old City, Philadelphia